Surfline Communications Limited (commonly  known as Surfline), is a Ghanaian internet service provider and WiFi network service company, providing 4G LTE and WiFi services.

History
Surfline Communications Limited was established in 2011, and they received their license from the National Communications Authority (NCA) that same year. The Surfline licenses terms ensured that Surfline must have provided 4G Long Term Evolution (LTE) network in Accra, Tema and Takoradi.

4G LTE and WiFi
Surfline has built a Long Term Evolution (LTE) network. Surfline is the designated 4G LTE network and WiFi network provider in Ghana

References

Companies established in 2011
Telecommunications in Ghana
International information technology consulting firms